Silks and Saddles is a 1921 Australian silent film set in the world of horse racing that was directed by John K. Wells.

The film is also known as Queen o' Turf or Queen of the Turf in the United States.

Plot summary 
On the stud farm of Kangarooie, squatter's daughter Bobbie wants her weak brother Richard to come home for her birthday, but she prefers the charms of the city, in particular the high society adventuress, Mrs Fane. Tubby Dennis O'Hara, who is in love with Bobbie, persuades Richard to come home and he brings Mrs Fane with him. O'Hara gives Bobbie his horse, Alert, as a present. Bobbie enters it in a race and Mrs Fane tries to stop her winning. Bobbie falls in love with a handsome man and rides Alert to victory.

Cast 
Brownie Vernon as Bobbie Morton
Robert MacKinnon as Richard Morton Jr
John Cosgrove as Dennis O'Hara
John Faulkner as Richard Morton Sr
Tal Ordell as Phillip Droone
Evelyn Johnson as Myra Fane
Raymond Lawrence as Jeffrey Manners
Gerald Harcourt as Toby Makin
Tommy Denman as Dingo
Kennaquhair (horse) as Alert

Production 
The film is one of the rare Australian movies to survive today almost in its entirety. It was made by Commonwealth Pictures, a company formed in October 1920 with Eric Griffin as managing director at a value of £10,000. They hired John K. Wells to direct; he was an American who moved to Australia with Wilfred Lucas to work as an assistant director.

The movie was shot in and around Sydney, including at Randwick racecourse and at Camden, with interiors at E. J. Carroll's studio at Palmerston in Waverly. Footage was taken involving an aeroplane, one of the first Australian movies to do so. The champion race horse Kennaquhair appears.

Reception
Le Maistre Walker, who helped set up Commonwealth Pictures, later claimed the film earned £17,000 in Australasia, of which only £3,900 was returned to the company. The UK rights were sold for £3,000 and the American rights for $16,000. Walker says that the US distributors made £30,000 out of the film. However, because of the associated costs, Commonwealth could only return 23/ of every £1 invested, and soon went out of business.

The film was the victim of block booking in the US so was retitled and edited to make it seem as if it was set in Virginia.

Wells appears to have never directed another feature film.

References

External links 

Silks and Saddles at National Film and Sound Archive

1921 films
American black-and-white films
American silent feature films
Australian silent films
Australian horse racing films
1920s sports films
1920s American films
1920s English-language films
Silent sports films